Samartu (also Romanized as S̄amartū) is a village in Dul Rural District, in the Central District of Urmia County, West Azerbaijan Province, Iran. At the 2006 census, its population was 372, in 108 families.

References 

Populated places in Urmia County